This Is Who We Are is the first DVD from the metalcore band As I Lay Dying. It was released on April 14, 2009, through Metal Blade Records. The video album sold 4,200 copies in the US during its first week of sales allowing it to debut at number 2 on the Top Music Videos chart. On May 18, 2009, the DVD was certified Gold in the US. It was also certified Platinum in Canada by the CRIA.

Track listing

Disc 1: Documentary
Complete band history includes in-depth artist interviews and commentary, interviews with friends and family, as well as observations and road stories from colleagues and bands that have worked with and befriended As I Lay Dying since the band's inception.

Disc 2: Live
Videos of live songs recorded from various locations during As I Lay Dying's 2008 tours.
"Falling Upon Deaf Ears" (Seacoast Community Church)
"Forever" (Seacoast Community Church)
"Meaning In Tragedy" (The Jumping Turtle)
"The Darkest Nights" (The Jumping Turtle)
"Separation" (The Grove of Anaheim)
"Nothing Left" (The Grove of Anaheim)
"An Ocean Between Us" (The Grove of Anaheim)
"Within Destruction" (The Grove of Anaheim)
"Forsaken" (The Grove of Anaheim)
"Distance Is Darkness" (The Grove of Anaheim)
"I Never Wanted" (The Grove of Anaheim)
"The Sound of Truth" (The Grove of Anaheim)
"94 Hours" (Cornerstone)
"Through Struggle" (Wacken Open Air)
"Reflection" (With Full Force Festival)
"Confined" (Wacken Open Air)

Disc 3: Music videos and bonus features
Music videos, additional live songs, touring stories, profiles on personalities & more.

Music videos
 "Nothing Left" (directed by Brian Thompson)
 "The Sound of Truth" (directed by Brian Thompson)
 "Within Destruction" (directed by Jerry Clubb)
 "Confined" (directed by Christopher Sims)
 "Through Struggle" (directed by Lex Halaby)
 "The Darkest Nights" (directed by Darren Doane)
 "Forever" (directed by Derek Dale)
 "94 Hours" (directed by Derek Dale)

Extra live performances
 "Elegy" (Seacoast Community Church)
 "Empty Hearts" (The Jumping Turtle)

Personnel
Tim Lambesis - lead vocals
Jordan Mancino - drums
Nick Hipa - lead guitar, backing vocals
Phillip Sgrosso - rhythm guitar, keyboards, backing vocals
Josh Gilbert - bass, clean vocals
Clint Norris - formerly bass, clean vocals
 Produced and directed by Denise Korycki
 Brian J. Ames
 Vince Edwards
 Dan Fitzgerald
 Kelli Malella
 Heather Parsons
 Brian Slagel - owner of Metal Blade Records
 Mike Faley
 Tracy Vera
 Kenny Gabor - Manager
 Vaughn Lewis - Manager
 Dave Miller
 Lia Starace
 Jim Starace
 Brian Cobbel - owner of Pluto Records
 Tommy Garcia - former guitarist/bassist
 Brandon Hays - former bassist/guitarist
 Kevin Puig - tour manager
AILD Crew
 Joey Bradford
 Andrew "Dayday" Perez
 Kyle Rosa
 Brandon Ward
 Joe Aguilar
 Brandon Peterson
 Jason Mancino

Certifications

References

As I Lay Dying (band) albums
2009 video albums
Heavy metal video albums
2009 compilation albums
Music video compilation albums
Live video albums
Metal Blade Records live albums
Metal Blade Records video albums
2009 live albums
Metal Blade Records compilation albums

nl:This Is Who We Are